Em Magan is a 2006 Indian Tamil-language family drama film written and directed by Thirumurugan. Bharath, Gopika, and Nassar played the lead roles, while Vadivelu, Saranya Ponvannan, and Gajala appeared in supporting roles. The music was composed by Vidyasagar with cinematography by Sevilo Raja and editing by Jeyakumar. Upon release on 7 September 2006, the film met with positive critical reception and became a commercial success. It was remade in Kannada as Puthra.

Plot 
Thirumalai owns a provision store in Karaikudi and lives with his family consisting of his wife Selvi, wife's younger brother 'Karupatti' Ayyakannu, son Krishna, and daughter. Thirumalai is very strict, short-tempered, and is referred as Emdan by his relatives. Krishna studies poultry science in a nearby college and also assists his father in managing the store. Krishnan worries about his father's repeated vehement behaviour towards him.

Divya is Krishna's classmate and is also the daughter of the auditor, Balasubramanian who manages Thirumalai's accounts. Divya proposes to Krishnan, who does not reciprocate. He tells her that he loves his maternal uncle Natarajan's daughter Janani. 12 years ago Thirumalai had asked a loan from Selvi's family to develop his shop, which was refused due to their financial condition. Then, in a festival in temple, Thirumalai slaps Selvi in front of both families for a petty reason, to insult her brothers. This leads to a tussle, and Krishna's family left that temple then. Since then enmity prevails between Thirumalai and his in-laws’ family. Krishnan lives with the hope that the two families will reunite someday, paving the way for his wedding.

Thirumalai's father-in-law Chellakannu is on his deathbed and his mother-in-law visit's Thirumalai's family, asking them to come to see her husband before he passes away. Thirumalai refuses and sends her back. The next day he leaves early to Madurai and Selvi and Krishna use his scooter to visit Chellakannu. Thirumalai returns halfway and a lot of confusion ensues, but Selvi and Krishna confuse him by going to Kunnakudi Murugan Temple and escape his punishment. The next night, Chellakannu passes away and the two families come to talking terms, making a truce to the enmity during the condolence. Krishnan feels excited upon waiting to meet Janani after so many years. Janani also reciprocates the same feeling towards Krishnan, and both love each other. One day, Krishnan is tempted to kiss Janani when there is a power cut. However, the power comes suddenly, and the entire family spots Krishnan kissing Janani.

Both Thirumalai and Natarajan get furious upon seeing this incident. A clash erupts between Thirumalai and Natarajan by blaming each other's child for the incident. Thirumalai beats up Krishnan and takes his family back home. However, Janani secretly hides in the car boot and comes along with them to Krishnan's house. Seeing this, Thirumalai gets even more furious and sends both Krishnan and Janani out of the home.

Krishnan, Janani and Ayyakannu meet Balasubramanian, and request to help the former find a job as he has now completed his college degree with distinction. Krishnan successfully secures a job in a poultry farm in Udumalaipettai with the help of Balasubramanian. Krishna marries Janani and she gave birth to a baby boy. Krishna works hard, his career progresses well, and his lifestyle improves. One day, Thirumalai needs the signature of his son Krishnan as he wanted to sell a property and goes to meet Krishnan. Thirumalai feels happy upon seeing his son in a good status but returns without expressing his happiness because of ego, but on the other hand, Natarajan meets Krishnan after their child is born and realises that he sincerely loves and takes care of Janani, unlike Thirumalai and Krishnan reunites with his maternal uncle happily.

Krishnan comes to meet Thirumalai with an alliance to be seen for his sister. An emotional conversation happens between the duo where the former expresses his feelings. Then Balasubramanian arranges engagement of Divya with the person who she loves now. In the end, Thirumalai overcomes his ego and expresses his happiness upon seeing his son's growth and finally reunites with him. The movie ends showing both the family members of Krishnan and Janani leading a joyful life together and the movie gives a happy ending.

Cast 
Bharath as Krishna
Gopika as Janani, Krishna's love interest, later wife
Nassar as Thirumalai (Emden), Krishna's father
Vadivelu as Karupatti Ayyakannu, Krishna's younger maternal uncle
Saranya Ponvannan as Selvi Thirumalai, Krishna's mother
Gajala as Divya, Krishna's classmate
Shanmugarajan as Natarajan, Janani's father
Rajyalakshmi as Janani's mother
Ennatha Kannaiya as Chellakannu, Selvi's father
Ravi Prakash as Auditor Balasubramaniam, Divya's Father and Krishna's mentor
Kadhal Kandhas as Krishna's cousin
Krupa as Vanitha, Krishna's sister

Production 
This was the debut venture of Television director Thirumurugan in cinema who made the successful series Metti Oli.

Soundtrack 

The soundtrack was composed by Vidyasagar.

Release 
The film was initially titled Emdan Magan, however the title was shortened to Em Magan to exploit the Tamil Nadu Government's rule of entertainment tax exemption for films with Tamil titles. The film released on 7 September 2006.

Critical reception 
The movie received positive reviews from critics. Many praised the performances of the lead cast and Nassar and Saranya's performances were praised as well. Many praises were also specially given to Vadivelu who shines in a role with equal opportunity for comedy, character and sentiments.

Behindwoods wrote, "The director has ensured that the producer recovers his money. A family melodrama well enacted. Thirumurugan is sure to continue his winning streak in Kollywood also.".

Nowrunning.com wrote, "The Director has made very good debut into the big screen. The story and proceedings are very natural and produces intense feelings. The families and women folk might turn up in good numbers for the film. Some care could have been spared to the length of the film which seems a little too much. It is a good family emotional drama which is a must watch for all class of audience, especially in this age of generational differences. Both elders who brag about irresponsible youth and youth who sulk about authoritative elders have to watch this film.".

OneIndia wrote, "Director M. Thirumurugan and his group have done a great job delivering an excellent movie reflecting family values and true love."

Sify wrote, "Thirumurugan has extracted spell-binding performance from his lead actors and supporting cast. [..] At a time where many movies seem to speak from their wallets, here is one that speaks from the heart.".

Indiagitz wrote, "At a time when commercial cliches are holding sway, the director has tried his luck with emotions and sentiments. The story is set in an average middle-class family and the strength of the director lies in getting the specifics right and real.".

Balaji Balasubramaniam of Thiraipadam.com wrote, "Bharath seems to be maturing into a very good and natural actor. He is able to express a lot of emotions with his expressions and body language and generates sympathy for his character. Nasser gets a role that makes full use of his piercing stares and rough voice. He is very convincing in the role and relishes the chance to play a fully realized character instead of the half-baked, two-dimensional villain roles he usually gets. Gopika looks as homely as the role calls for and has good chemistry with Bharath while Gajala is wasted in a throw-away role. Saranya, as always, is able to generate laughs with her slightly whiny voice while Vadivelu shines in a role with equal opportunity for both comedy and sentiments. Vidyasagar comes up with a nice melody in Unnodu Thaan."

S. R. Ashok Kumar of The Hindu wrote, "Director Thirumurugan weaves through emotions and sentiments which form the base of the story. [..] Thirumurugan, directing his first film, has shown that he can handle family drama quite well. He has a tight script and the scenes are arranged well leading to the climax. It is touching to find the son showing concern for the father in spite of the humiliation heaped on him. Such subtle touches show much thought has gone into the film. And the viewers are sure to relate to the scenes that are so down-to-earth.".

Awards 
 Filmfare Awards South
 Filmfare Award for Best Supporting Actress – Tamil – Saranya

Tamil Nadu State Film Awards
 Best Director – Thirumurugan
 Best Supporting Actor – Nassar
 Best Supporting Actress – Saranya

References

External links 

2006 drama films
Indian drama films
2006 films
Tamil films remade in other languages
Films about father–son relationships
2000s Tamil-language films
Films scored by Vidyasagar
2006 directorial debut films